The St. Michael volcanic field is a volcanic field located on St. Michael and Stuart Islands in western Alaska, United States. It contains 55 cones and craters, including low broad shield volcanoes and maars. It is considered part of the Bering Sea Volcanic Province.

While there are no written records of eruptions in recent history, Eskimo elders have an account of the mountains smoking in the region. The oldest Eskimo settlements in Western Alaska date to around 200-500 BC, so mountains in the St. Michael volcanic field likely erupted sometime within the last 3,000 years.

Volcanoes
Volcanoes within the St. Michael volcanic field include:
  Crater Mountain
 The Sisters
 St. Michael Mountain
 Stephens Hill
 Stuart Hill
 West Hill

References

Landforms of Nome Census Area, Alaska
Volcanic fields of Alaska
Volcanoes of Alaska
Maars of Alaska
Volcanoes of Unorganized Borough, Alaska